Bismarck Conservation Area consists of  southwest of Bismarck, Missouri. The area surrounds  DiSalvo Lake. The lake was constructed in 1944 by Hanna Mining Company, and the Missouri Department of Conservation acquired the land from Hanna Mining Company in 1981. 

Bismarck Conservation Area includes a parking areas, boat ramp, two designated trails, and fishing dock. The area is open to hunting and fishing.

Services 
 Bird Watching 
 Bicycling 
 Fishing Hiking
 Horseback Riding 
 Hunting 
 Outdoor Photography 
 Wildlife Viewing

Hunting and Trapping 
 Archery and firearms deer hunting is permitted for antlered or antlerless deer on the following permits only: Archer’s Hunting Permit and Firearms Any-Deer Permit. No archery antlerless or firearms antlerless permits may be used. Closed to firearms deer hunting during the urban zones and antlerless portions. All other statewide deer seasons and limits apply. 
 Portable tree stands may be used and only between Sept. 1 and Jan. 31. Stands must be identified with the name and address, or conservation number, of the user. Screw-in steps or other materials that would damage the tree are prohibited.
 Decoys and portable blinds are permitted but must be removed from the area daily. Blinds may be constructed on-site, but only from willows and non-woody vegetation.
 Furbearer trapping is permitted by special use permit.

Fishing and Boating 
 Fish may be taken only by pole and line and not more than 3 poles may be used by any person.
 Daily limit is 6 black bass, 4 catfish (channel, blue and flathead combined) and 30 crappie. Total number of all other fish may not exceed 20.
 All black bass between 12 and 15 inches must be released immediately after being caught.
 Outboard motors in excess of 10 horsepower must be operated at slow, no-wake speed.
 Disabled accessible fishing pier and parking area available.

References

Protected areas established in 1981
Protected areas of Iron County, Missouri
Protected areas of St. Francois County, Missouri
Protected areas of Washington County, Missouri
Conservation Areas of Missouri